Johan Puke (October 20, 1726, Klinte, Gotland – July 23,1756), was a Swedish officer. He was executed for treason as one of the conspirators participating in the failed coup d'etat of queen Louisa Ulrika, the Coup of 1756. Johan Puke was the father of Johan af Puke, a Swedish naval officer who participated in the Russo-Swedish War (1788–1790). In 1744 he became a Sargent in the artillery.

References
 Stålsvärd (Ståhlsverd), Magnus i Nordisk familjebok (andra upplagan, 1918)

1726 births
1756 deaths
Executed Swedish people
People executed by Sweden by decapitation
18th-century Swedish military personnel
18th-century executions by Sweden
People executed for treason against Sweden
Age of Liberty people